This is a complete list of women's medalists of the European Athletics Indoor Championships.

60 metres

400 metres

800 metres

1500 metres

3000 metres

60 metres hurdles

4 × 400 metres relay

High jump

Long jump

Triple jump

Pole vault

Shot put

Pentathlon

Defunct events

200 metres

4 × 1 lap relay

4×2 laps relay

Medley relay

3000 metres race walk

See also
List of European Athletics Championships medalists (men)
List of European Athletics Championships medalists (women)
List of European records in athletics

References
European Indoor Championships (Women). GBR Athletics. Retrieved on 2017-04-03.
European Athletic Association Result Database

European Indoor Championships women
Athletics European Indoor Championships
Medalists women